Beskaragay  is a district of Abai Region in eastern Kazakhstan. The administrative center of the district is the selo of Beskaragay. Population:

References

Districts of Kazakhstan
East Kazakhstan Region